"Songbird" is a song by the British-American rock band Fleetwood Mac. The song first appeared on the band's 1977 album Rumours and was released as the B-side of the single "Dreams". It is one of four songs written solely by Christine McVie on the album. McVie frequently sang the song at the end of Fleetwood Mac concerts.

Background
McVie wrote "Songbird" in half an hour around midnight, but didn't have anyone around to record it. To ensure she did not forget the chord structure and melody, she remained awake the entire night. The next day, McVie played the song for producer Ken Caillat at the Sausalito Record Plant.

Caillat loved the track and suggested she record it alone in a concert style approach. Their first venue of choice, the Berkeley Community Theatre, was unavailable, so the band instead booked the Zellerbach Auditorium for March 3, 1976. To create the appropriate ambience, Caillat ordered a bouquet of flowers to place on McVie's piano. He then requested three spotlights to illuminate the flowers from above. When McVie arrived at the auditorium, the house lights were dimmed so her attention was immediately brought to the illuminated flowers on the piano.

For the recording session, 15 microphones were placed around the auditorium to capture the performance. The recording session went into the next morning due to the difficulty of recording the song live in one take. Lindsey Buckingham strummed an acoustic guitar offstage to keep the tempo.

Personnel
Christine McVie – piano, vocals
Lindsey Buckingham – acoustic guitar

Charts

Weekly charts

Certifications

Cover versions
Rita Coolidge covered "Songbird" on her 1978 album Love Me Again (album).

Eva Cassidy version
Eva Cassidy's version was released in 1998 on her posthumous compilation album of the same name Songbird. Despite being released two years after her death from melanoma, the album eventually reached number 1 in the UK in 2001. "Songbird" finally charted in the UK in September 2009 at number 56, after a contestant (Shanna Goodhead) performed the song on The X Factor.

Willie Nelson covered "Songbird" on his own 2006 album Songbird, making it the second album to be named after the song. The album peaked at number 87 on the Billboard 200.

References

1977 songs
2006 singles
Fleetwood Mac songs
Willie Nelson songs
Songs written for films
Songs written by Christine McVie
Song recordings produced by Ken Caillat
Song recordings produced by Richard Dashut
Warner Records singles